Events from the year 1572 in Ireland.

Incumbent
Monarch: Elizabeth I

Events
First Desmond rebellion ends (started in 1568).
Sack of Athenry by the Mac an Iarlas.

Births
Hugh Roe O'Donnell, Prince of Tyrconnell, helped to lead the Nine Years War (d. 1602).

Deaths

References

 
1570s in Ireland
Ireland
Years of the 16th century in Ireland